Gary Taylor, also known as Gary Taylor Sabo, is an American bassist, singer, and songwriter who has worked with bands including Angeldust, with Criss Angel, Klayton, Saraya, D.L. Byron, Garbo Talks, and NYC. He was born Gary T. Szabo on November 27, 1960, and is of Hungarian and Irish ancestry.

Career
In 1989 Taylor worked with Saraya, playing bass and singing backup vocals on their debut CD. The release includes the Top 40 hits "Love Has Taken Its Toll" and "Back to the Bullet."

In the 1990s Taylor's style shifted from album rock to industrial music, as evidenced by Taylor's collaboration with Criss Angel. They co-wrote and participated in numerous songs that eventually appeared on Angel's Mindfreak television series. This collaboration is still in effect to this day.

Taylor remains active in the music industry and has been a member of ASCAP since 1992.
 Taylor uses Fender Jazz, Warwick and Rickenbacker 4001 electric bass guitars.

References

Living people
1960 births
20th-century American bass guitarists